Kripa Shanker was an Indian politician. He was elected to the Lok Sabha, the lower house of the Parliament of India from Domariyaganj, Uttar Pradesh as a member of the Indian National Congress.

References

External links
 Official Biographical Sketch in Lok Sabha Website
1897 births

20th-century deaths
Year of death missing
Indian National Congress politicians from Uttar Pradesh

Lok Sabha members from Uttar Pradesh
India MPs 1962–1967